Bradley Leeb (born August 27, 1979) is a retired Cree First Nations Canadian ice hockey player. He played 5 games in the NHL for the Vancouver Canucks and Toronto Maple Leafs, and spent the bulk of his professional career in the minor American Hockey League, as well as several years playing in Germany and the United Kingdom, before retiring in 2013.

Career
Leeb started his career playing for the Red Deer Midget Chiefs in the Alberta Midget Hockey League. He played 3 games for his hometown Red Deer Rebels as a 15-year-old, then went on to play 4 full seasons with the Rebels. He also played in the 1998–1999 WHL All-Star game.

Leeb played for Team Canada at the 1999 World Junior Ice Hockey Championships in Winnipeg, Manitoba. Canada won silver after losing to the Russians in triple overtime. Leeb finished tied for second in team scoring with Simon Gagne, Kyle Calder, and Brendan Morrow, all had 8 points in 7 games.

In 1999–2000, Leeb signed with the Vancouver Canucks as a free agent. He was with the Canucks organization for three seasons, appearing in 4 games with the Canucks while playing in the minor league system with the (Syracuse Crunch (AHL), Kansas City Blades) (IHL), and Manitoba Moose (AHL).

In 2002–03, Leeb was traded to the Toronto Maple Leafs for Tomas Mojzis. Leeb played one game for the Maple Leafs, and mainly played in the Maple Leafs minor league system with the St. John's Maple Leafs (AHL) and the Toronto Marlies (AHL).

Leeb played the 2007–08 season in Germany for ERC Ingolstadt in the Deutsche Eishockey Liga (DEL).

In 2008–2009, he went to play for the Thomas Sabo Ice Tigers (DEL) in the city of Nuremberg, Germany.

Leeb played in Nuremberg on the same team as his older brother Greg Leeb for 4 seasons, from 2008–2012. It was the first time the brothers had ever played on the same team. Growing up they played against each other in the WHL, IHL, AHL, and the DEL leagues.

Leeb was the creator of the website , a website that allowed betting on hockey games. He no longer owns the website.

On July 17, 2012, it was announced that Leeb had signed with the Coventry Blaze for the 2012–13 Elite League season, following his brother who signed earlier in the month.

On April 8, 2013, Leeb announced his retirement.

Leeb holds a master's degree in Sports Management from Coventry University.

Career statistics

Regular season and playoffs

International

Awards and achievements
 Named to the WHL East Second All-Star Team in 1999

References

External links

1979 births
Canadian ice hockey right wingers
Coventry Blaze players
Sportspeople from Red Deer, Alberta
Kansas City Blades players
ERC Ingolstadt players
Living people
Manitoba Moose players
Red Deer Rebels players
Thomas Sabo Ice Tigers players
St. John's Maple Leafs players
Syracuse Crunch players
Toronto Maple Leafs players
Toronto Marlies players
Undrafted National Hockey League players
Vancouver Canucks players
Ice hockey people from Alberta
First Nations sportspeople